"Vivid Colors" is the third single by L'Arc-en-Ciel, released on July 6, 1995, it reached number 16 on the Oricon chart. It was re-released on August 30, 2006.

Track listing

Chart positions

References

1995 singles
L'Arc-en-Ciel songs
Songs written by Hyde (musician)
Songs written by Ken (musician)
1995 songs
Ki/oon Music singles